Trechus zvarici is a species of ground beetle in the subfamily Trechinae. It was described by Belousov & Kabak in 1998.

References

zvarici
Beetles described in 1998